Kozmino is the name of several rural localities in Russia:

Modern inhabited localities
Kozmino, Kotlassky District, Arkhangelsk Oblast, a village in Koryazhemsky Selsoviet of Kotlassky District of Arkhangelsk Oblast
Kozmino, Lensky District, Arkhangelsk Oblast, a selo in Kozminsky Selsoviet of Lensky District of Arkhangelsk Oblast
Kozmino, Kirov Oblast, a village in Smetaninsky Rural Okrug of Sanchursky District of Kirov Oblast

Abolished inhabited localities
Kozmino, Primorsky Krai, a former rural locality in Primorsky Krai; since 2004—a part of the city of Nakhodka